Kaia Kanepi was the defending champion, but decided not to participate.

5th seed Anabel Medina Garrigues defeated 7th seed Polona Hercog in the final, 6–3, 6–2.

Seeds

Qualifying

Draw

Finals

Top half

Bottom half

References
 Main Draw

Internazionali Femminili di Palermo - Singles
2011 Singles